Flavia Mignola (born 20 October 1985) is an Argentine former professional tennis player.

A right-handed player from Santa Fe, Mignola began competing in professional tournaments in 2001. She reached a career-high singles ranking of 372, winning an ITF title in Los Mochis in 2005. Most successful as a doubles player, she won a total of 18 ITF doubles titles, with a best ranking of 222 in the world.

ITF finals

Singles: 5 (1–4)

Doubles: 28 (18–10)

References

External links
 
 

1985 births
Living people
Argentine female tennis players
Sportspeople from Santa Fe, Argentina
20th-century Argentine women
21st-century Argentine women